Also known as Portsmouth Port or Portsmouth Continental Ferry Port, Portsmouth International Port is a cruise, ferry and cargo terminal located in the city of Portsmouth on the south coast of England.

History
Portsmouth investigated three locations for a ferry port at the end of the 1960s, before the current location was chosen. The choice was based on cost and the likely benefit of cross-channel ferries. The site was at the end of the newly constructed M275. Originally built with two berths the site opened in 1976 with the Earl William (Sealink) running to the Channel Islands, the Viking Victory (Townsend Thoresen) running to Cherbourg, and Brittany Ferries running to Saint-Malo.

Ro-Ro Freight and Passenger Ferry Operations

Future developments 
In early 2019, it was announced that owners Portsmouth City Council had agreed to invest £33.7m to expand the Port. £18.7m would go towards developments within Portsmouth International Port. This would include levelling and extending Berth 2 so it could accommodate ships up to 255m in length, upgrading the passenger terminal to provide dedicated facilities for cruise passengers and replacing the 35 year-old passenger boarding tower. It is predicted that the improvements will lead to an increase in the number of cruise passengers at the Port from 50,000 to 150,000 in the coming years.

The remaining £15m will be invested in improving facilities at Portico (formerly MMD Shipping Services), who operate two commercial quays within the Port.

Isle of Wight Ferries

Ferry services to the Isle of Wight, operated by Wightlink, also depart from Portsmouth from other terminals within the city, away from Portsmouth International Port. The car ferry, which sails to Fishbourne, uses a dedicated terminal based in Old Portsmouth. In addition, a passenger catamaran service sails from Portsmouth Harbour railway station to Ryde Pier.

External links
 The Official Website of Portsmouth International Port.
Wightlink

References 

Portsmouth
Transport in Portsmouth